Lefevrea is a genus of leaf beetles in the subfamily Eumolpinae. It is distributed in Africa.

Species

Lefevrea abdominalis Jacoby, 1897
Lefevrea aeneicollis Jacoby, 1897
Lefevrea aeneoviridis Bryant, 1932
Lefevrea ancora Burgeon, 1940
Lefevrea andrewi Selman, 1972
Lefevrea angolensis Weise, 1908
Lefevrea annae Burgeon, 1940
Lefevrea atra Bryant, 1932
Lefevrea atromaculata Bryant, 1932
Lefevrea bicolorata Bryant, 1959
Lefevrea bicoloripes Pic, 1939
Lefevrea brunnea Jacoby, 1900
Lefevrea carpenteri Bryant, 1932
Lefevrea collina Bryant, 1954
Lefevrea conradsi Pic, 1939
Lefevrea costulata Weise, 1909
Lefevrea cribricollis Pic, 1938
Lefevrea cuprea Bryant, 1954
Lefevrea curtipennis Pic, 1940
Lefevrea dentatipes Pic, 1939
Lefevrea dollmani Bryant, 1932
Lefevrea fabianae Zoia, 2020
Lefevrea flava Bryant, 1954
Lefevrea fulvicollis Jacoby, 1904
Lefevrea fulvipes Jacoby, 1897
Lefevrea gedyei Bryant, 1932
Lefevrea hirsuta Jacoby, 1900
Lefevrea humeralis Weise, 1924
Lefevrea intermedia Jacoby, 1897
Lefevrea ivoirensis Selman, 1973
Lefevrea kibonotensis Weise, 1909
Lefevrea lamottei Bryant, 1954
Lefevrea leroyi Burgeon, 1940
Lefevrea longelytrata Burgeon, 1940
Lefevrea magna Selman, 1972
Lefevrea margareta Selman, 1972
Lefevrea maynei Burgeon, 1940
Lefevrea megacephala Burgeon, 1940
Lefevrea metallica Bryant, 1932
Lefevrea milnei Selman, 1973
Lefevrea minuta Jacoby, 1897
Lefevrea moesta Weise, 1919
Lefevrea moyoensis Selman, 1972
Lefevrea nigriceps Burgeon, 1940
Lefevrea nigrocaerulea Bryant, 1932
Lefevrea nitida Pic, 1939
Lefevrea obscurilabris Pic, 1939
Lefevrea pilosa Burgeon, 1940
Lefevrea pubipennis Bryant, 1932
Lefevrea pubiventris Bryant, 1940
Lefevrea puncticollis Jacoby, 1897
Lefevrea rotundata Burgeon, 1940
Lefevrea rufa (Pic, 1941)
Lefevrea ruficollis Pic, 1939
Lefevrea schoutedeni Burgeon, 1940
Lefevrea schubotzi Weise, 1915
Lefevrea scutellaris Burgeon, 1940
Lefevrea semistriata Jacoby, 1901
Lefevrea signata Weise, 1924
Lefevrea subtestacea Pic, 1939
Lefevrea testacea Pic, 1939
Lefevrea thoracica Jacoby, 1901
Lefevrea troupini Selman, 1972
Lefevrea tunguensis Selman, 1972
Lefevrea turneri Bryant, 1954
Lefevrea ugandensis Bryant, 1932
Lefevrea unifasciata Pic, 1939
Lefevrea uninotata Pic, 1938
Lefevrea viridescens Pic, 1939
Lefevrea wittei Burgeon, 1942

References

Eumolpinae
Chrysomelidae genera
Beetles of Africa
Taxa named by Martin Jacoby